Radu Albot and Enrique López Pérez were the defending champions but chose not to defend their title.

Zdeněk Kolář and Luis David Martínez won the title after defeating Rafael Matos and João Menezes 1–6, 6–3, [10–3] in the final.

Seeds

Draw

References

External links
 Main draw

San Marino Open - Doubles
2021 Doubles